Jacques Daget (30 June 1919, Vineuil – 29 June 2009), was a French ichthyologist. He was a professor at the National Museum of Natural History, in Paris. Several marine species have been named after him.

Species named after him 
Species named after Daget include:
 Claroteidae Chrysichthys dageti Risch 1992
 Cichlidae Tilapia dageti Thys van den Audenaerde 1971
 Nothobranchiidae Epiplatys dageti dageti Poll, 1953
 Nothobranchiidae Epiplatys dageti monroviae Arnoult & Daget 1965

See also
:Category:Taxa named by Jacques Daget
 :species:Jacques Daget

References

1919 births
2009 deaths
French ichthyologists
20th-century French zoologists